Austin Collins (born September 18, 1992), better known as Au5, is an American electronic musician from New Jersey. Au5's music encompasses a range of electronic genres such as dubstep, house, trance, drum and bass, drumstep and ambient, and he is known for fusing the characteristics of trance and dubstep in his music. Au5 is best known for his releases on Canadian label Monstercat, some of which have received millions of views on YouTube.

Au5's label releases began in 2012, and after winning a Seven Lions remix contest in January 2013, he joined Monstercat. Au5 had several successful releases on the label, such as "Halcyon", with American producer Fractal, "Snowblind", featuring Tasha Baxter, and "Crossroad", featuring Danyka Nadeau. "Halcyon" and "Snowblind" reached number one on Beatport's dubstep charts. Au5 also performed at South by Southwest festival in Austin, Texas, in 2015.

Au5 departed Monstercat in late 2015. He later toured with Swedish producer Liquid Stranger and Israeli duo Infected Mushroom and performed at Motion Notion festival in British Columbia, Canada, in 2016. He also made two releases on British label NoCopyrightSounds, "Lush", with American duo Last Heroes featuring Holly Drummond, and "Closer", featuring Danyka Nadeau. Au5 returned to Monstercat in 2018 with the single "The Journey", featuring Australian musician Trove.

Au5 has collaborated with various artists including BT, Crystal Skies, Fractal, Mr. Bill, Last Heroes and Seven Lions, among others. Dancing Astronaut described him as a "meticulous producer" with a "unique, complex brand of melodic dubstep and surrounding genres".

Early life 
Born in New Jersey, Collins was exposed to music at an early age and began weekly classical piano lessons at age four. Collins's first experience with music software was Easy Beat by Ergonis Software, a multitrack MIDI sequencer for Mac, which he used at age eight to sequence out random music ideas. At age 11, he obtained a new Mac with GarageBand, which furthered his music production interest. At age 13, he began learning bass guitar and digital music production on Logic Pro. He later played in several rock and metal bands. Collins began producing trance music at age 15, around 2008.

Career

2010–2012: Early success 
Au5's debut release was the self-released ten-track album Minimality in September 2010, which featured both electronic and acoustic styles such as trance, ambient, acid jazz and piano. This was followed by the self-released eight-track album Anchus Definy in June 2011, which was the first release to feature dubstep. In May 2012, Au5 released his first EP, Iconoclast, on Atom Recordings, which consisted of five dubstep tracks. He subsequently released a dubstep VIP of "The Seahorse" from Anchus Definy and an original dubstep track titled "Iteration" on Excision's label Rottun Recordings in June 2012. After one year in college, Collins dropped out around late 2012 to pursue the Au5 project.

In November 2012, Au5 and American producer BT released the house track "Partysaurus Overflow". The track was inspired by BT's house track "Partysaurus Rex", which was featured on the 2012 Toy Story Toons short of the same name. The Au5 and BT version would later be included on the 2014 Walt Disney Records compilation album Dconstructed.

In January 2013, Au5 and Brazilian duo I.Y.F.F.E. won a 2012 remix contest held by Seven Lions for their drumstep remix of his dubstep track "Days To Come". The remix was released on Skrillex's label Owsla. Au5 described this in April 2013 as one of several turning points in his music career.

2013–2015: Monstercat 
In February 2013, Au5 joined Canadian label Monstercat and released the electro house track "Sweet" with Icelandic producer Auratic and I.Y.F.F.E. In May, Au5 and Fractal released "Halcyon", a drumstep track, which reached number one on Beatport's dubstep chart. In July, Au5 collaborated with BT and English musician Aqualung on BT's house track "Surrounded", from the album A Song Across Wires. Au5 and Fractal also made a dubstep remix of "Surrounded". The tracks were released on Dutch label Armada Music. In August, Au5 released his first EP on Monstercat, Blossom, featuring two tracks, "Blossom" (dubstep) and "Moonland" (drum and bass/drumstep). In December, he released the four-track Secret Weapon EP with Fractal.

In March 2014, Au5 released the progressive house track "Follow You", featuring Danyka Nadeau, which was followed up by a remix EP in July, featuring remixes by Ducked Ape, Fractal, Rootkit, Virtual Riot and Volant as well as a VIP. In August, Au5 released the dubstep track "Snowblind", featuring Tasha Baxter, which reached number one on Beatport's dubstep chart a week later. , the track had over 11 million views on Monstercat's official YouTube channel. In November, he released the trance track "Crossroad", featuring Danyka Nadeau, which  also had over 11 million views on Monstercat's official YouTube channel.

In March 2015, Au5 performed at the South by Southwest festival in Austin, Texas. In May, he released the glitch hop track "Dream of Love" with Heavy J, featuring Kenny Raye, on Simplified Recordings. This was followed by the electro house track "Inside", featuring Danyka Nadeau, in June, the dubstep track "Atlantis" in September and the progressive house track "Guardians", featuring Fiora, in October. In September, Au5 released a remix of "Fields of Grey" by Infected Mushroom on Dim Mak Records. Au5's last release on Monstercat until 2018 was "Ison / Pavonine" with Fractal, in November. Au5 stated that he had begun to deviate with the label in terms of sound.

2016–2017: Freefall and other projects 
In early 2016, Au5 toured the United States with Swedish producer Liquid Stranger and American producer Space Jesus on the "Rise of the Wakaan" tour, his first major tour. In July 2016, Au5 performed at Motion Notion festival in Golden, British Columbia, Canada, which he has said was one of his favourite places to perform at. He also toured with Israeli duo Infected Mushroom on their Return to the Sauce album tour in late 2016 and early 2017. In November 2016, Au5 released Freefall, a four-track EP with Christina Soto, on Gravitas Recordings.

In January 2017, Au5 released his first sample pack, Elemental, on Splice Sounds, followed by a second sample pack in December based on the Freefall EP. He continued to release tracks in 2017, including a self-released VIP of "Blossom" in March and the self-released dubstep tracks "Arise" in June and "Yea Boi" with American producer River Accorsi in July. In November, Au5 released "Goo Lagoon" on Gravitas Recordings. He also released his first track on NoCopyrightSounds, "Lush", with American duo Last Heroes featuring Holly Drummond, in November.

2018–present: Return to Monstercat and Divinorum
In March 2018, Au5 and Australian producer Mr. Bill released the ten-track EP The Recency Effect on Upscale Recordings, featuring five original tracks and five remixes. In April 2018, Au5 released a second track on NoCopyrightSounds, "Closer" featuring Danyka Nadeau. In August 2018, Au5 returned to the Monstercat label with the dubstep single "The Journey", featuring Australian musician Trove. The same month, he self-released the dubstep track "Cataclysm" with Crystal Skies. Au5 also toured with Seven Lions on his "Journey II" tour in late 2018. In October, Au5 released a midtempo remix of "Eon" by American electronic rock musician Celldweller for a remix compilation album titled Remixed Upon A Blackstar, released on FiXT Music. In November, he collaborated with American musician Nytrix to release the dubstep track "Only In A Dream" on Monstercat.

Au5 continued to release music in 2019, both on Monstercat and with self-releases. These include Energize EP in February, the electro house track "Eden", featuring Danyka Nadeau in March, the self-released ten-track LP Divinorum in May and the dubstep track "Way Down" with AMIDY, featuring Karra, in July. In March, Au5's 2013 electro house track with Fractal "Smoke", from the Secret Weapon EP, was featured on the Harmonix virtual reality game Audica. In July, Au5 appeared on Canadian musician and YouTuber Andrew Huang's "Four Producers Flip the Same Sample" YouTube series, in which the producers were tasked with making a track out of a door-creaking sample. His production was a house track titled "Door House". In October, Au5 performed at Liquid Stranger's new Wakaan Festival in Ozark, Arkansas, United States.

In February 2020, Au5 collaborated with Nytrix a second time to release the dubstep track "Always In A Nightmare". In March, Au5 collaborated with Seven Lions and Crystal Skies on Seven Lions's dubstep track "Remember", released on Seven Lions's label Ophelia Records. He later released his fourth LP, Alchemy, which featured a downtempo style of music.

Musical style 
Au5's music encompasses a range of electronic genres, including dubstep, house, trance, drum and bass, drumstep and ambient. Au5 has described his sound as "melodically and sonically rich electronic music" and has noted that he is especially known for his take on dubstep. He has described himself as fusing the characteristics of trance and dubstep in his music. Au5 has described his earliest favourite styles, before the rise of dubstep, as "trance, glitch/IDM and acid jazz". As dubstep gained prominence, he became drawn to the genre.

Au5 has cited BT as an influence, whom he first heard through the 2011 track "A Million Stars". He has also named Aphex Twin, Infected Mushroom, Isqa, Koven, Madeon, MakO, Mr. Bill, Tennyson, Seven Lions, Sorrow and Xilent as influences. Au5 has stated that his primary influence for producing ambient music was the 1995 Jonn Serrie track "Continuum", which he heard at around age 16.

Personal life 
, Au5 was living in Denver, Colorado. He had previously lived in California from 2015 to 2016. He has described himself as a "pretty reclusive person [...] despite [his] social abilities".

Au5 has described Fractal as a major personal influence and friend. He also became friends with BT.

Discography

Albums

Extended plays

Singles

Remixes

Other tracks

References

External links 
 Official website

1992 births
Ableton Live users
American electronic musicians
Dubstep musicians
Electro house musicians
Living people
Monstercat artists
American trance musicians